Aniba is an American  neotropical flowering plant genus in the family Lauraceae. They are present in low and mountain cloud forest in Caribbean islands, Central America, and northern to central South America.

Description 
They are shrubs or trees up to 25 m high, hermaphrodites. The leaves are  alternate, entire, and elliptical or narrowly elliptical. The inflorescences are paniculate and axillary, the flowers are arranged in cymes essentially, and those strictly opposite side are small. The fruit is a berry-like drupe dispersed mostly by birds. Fruits are 3 cm long and 1.5 cm wide, with deep domes, and warty.
Many species have a valuable timber in yellow wood, others have the wood and bark pleasantly scented. The oils extracted from certain species are used as ingredients in the manufacture of perfumes.

Ecology
Aniba is a genus of great ecological importance.  It currently includes 41 species, classified into six different subgroups, in which the woody structures are almost undifferentiated; the differences are ecological adaptations to different environments over a relatively dry-wet climate. Species in less humid environments are smaller or less robust, with less abundant and thinner foliage and have oleifera cells that give trees a more fragrant aroma.

Found throughout the Guyanas and the Amazon region, and also in the Pacific coastal areas of Colombia, they grow mostly in tropical forests and Andean cloud forest, but have also been found in stubbles and pastures. Distribution of Aniba extends from the islands of the Antilles in the Caribbean to Central America, Nicaragua, Costa Rica, the Guyanas, Venezuela, Colombia, and Peru in the coastal ranges and interior in wet areas, the Andes, and to dry regions of central and southern Brazil.

They do not form large stands, but rather small groups of trees with densities up to one individual per five hectares.  Due to the low density, exploitation of the natural populations is to the detriment of the rainforest. Overexploitation of the easily accessible trees of the rainforest has been reducing exports since the mid-1990s. Due to the distribution in inaccessible rainforest regions and its low density, it is hard to survey population trends in figures, but overexploitation is evident. 

Fourteen of the most known trees are used by the timber industry. In general, the wood from Aniba species has a high commercial value. The woods are typically yellowish with a greenish hue when fresh, becoming brown or olive on exposure to air.  Narrow sapwood is light yellowish.  Luster is medium to high; grain is straight to interlocked; texture is fine to medium; they have a spicy odor, and the taste may be distinctive.

Species 
49 species are currently accepted:
 Aniba affinis (Meisn.) Mez – southeastern Colombia, southern Venezuela, and northern Brazil
 Aniba bracteata (Nees) Mez – Puerto Rico, Lesser Antilles, Costa Rica, and Ecuador
 Aniba burchellii Kosterm. – southeastern Colombia, southern Venezuela, and Brazil
 Aniba canelilla Mez
 Aniba cinnamomiflora C.K.Allen
 Aniba citrifolia (Nees) Mez
 Aniba coto (Rusby) Kosterm.
 Aniba cylindriflora Kosterm.
 Aniba desertorum (Nees) Mez
 Aniba excelsa Kosterm.
 Aniba ferrea Kubitzki 1982
 Aniba ferruginea Kubitzki 1982
 Aniba firmula (Nees & Mart.) Mez, 1889
 Aniba flexuosa A.C.Sm., 1935
 Aniba foeniculacea Mez, 1906
 Aniba fragrans Ducke 1925
 Aniba guianensis Aubl.
 Aniba heterotepala van der Werff
 Aniba hostmanniana (Nees) Mez
 Aniba hypoglauca Sandwith
 Aniba inaequabilis Da Matta
 Aniba intermedia (Meisn.) Mez 1889
 Aniba jenmanii Mez
 Aniba kappleri Mez
 Aniba lancifolia Kubitzki & W.A.Rodrigues
 Aniba magnifica W.Palacios
 Aniba megaphylla Mez
 Aniba muca (Ruiz & Pav.) Mez
 Aniba novo-granatensis Kubitzki 1982
 Aniba panurensis (Meisn.) Mez
 Aniba parviflora (Meisn.) Mez 1889
 Aniba pedicellata Kosterm. 1938
 Aniba percoriacea C.K.Allen 1964
 Aniba permollis (Nees) Mez
 Aniba perutilis Hemsl. 1894
 Aniba pilosa  1994
 Aniba puchury-minor (Mart.) Mez
 Aniba ramageana Mez
 Aniba riparia (Nees) Mez
 Aniba robusta (Klotzsch & P.Karst.) Mez 1889
 Aniba rosaeodora Ducke 1930
 Aniba santalodora Ducke 1950
 Aniba subbullata H.Ribeiro & P.L.R.Moraes
 Aniba sulcata Benoist 1929
 Aniba vaupesiana Kubitzki 1982
 Aniba venezuelana Mez 1889
 Aniba viridis Mez
 Aniba vulcanicola van der Werff 1994
 Aniba williamsii Brooks 1931

References 
 
Flora de Nicaragua

 
Lauraceae genera
Taxa named by Jean Baptiste Christian Fusée-Aublet
Neotropical realm flora
Taxonomy articles created by Polbot